Antonio García Ángel is a Colombian writer. He studied at the Javeriana University in Bogota. He published his first novel in 2001, and has since published a dozen books. In 2004, he studied for a year with the Nobel-winning novelist Mario Vargas Llosa under the Rolex Mentor and Protégé Arts Initiative. In 2007, he was named as one of the Bogota39, a selection of the best young writers in Latin America.

References

Colombian male novelists
Year of birth missing (living people)
Living people
21st-century Colombian novelists